James Guy Dalley Arkins (14 October 1888 – 2 August 1980) was an Australian politician.

Born in Millthorpe, New South Wales, he was educated at public schools before becoming a builder. In 1915 he was elected to the New South Wales Legislative Assembly as the Labor member for Castlereagh. After the Labor split of 1916 over conscription, Arkins joined the Nationalist Party. While still an MLA, he served in the military from 1916 to 1919. In 1920 he transferred to the seat of St George, and in 1927 to Rockdale. He contested Waverley in 1932, following the abolition of Rockdale, but was defeated by William Clementson.

On 26 September 1935, Arkins was appointed to the Australian Senate as a member of the United Australia Party (UAP) (successor to the Nationalist Party), filling the vacancy caused by the death of NSW Senator Lionel Courtenay, who had died 11 days after being sworn in. In the 1937 federal election, an election was held for four NSW Senate seats, all of which were won by the Labor Party using the infamous "four A's" strategy, whereby the ALP selected candidates whose names all began with the letter A.

Arkins returned to the New South Wales Legislative Assembly, winning Dulwich Hill in 1938 and holding it until 1941. He died in 1980. He was the last surviving member of the 1935–1937 Senate.

References

 

 

Australian builders
Australian Labor Party members of the Parliament of New South Wales
Nationalist Party of Australia members of the Parliament of New South Wales
United Australia Party members of the Parliament of Australia
Members of the Australian Senate for New South Wales
Members of the Australian Senate
Members of the New South Wales Legislative Assembly
1888 births
1980 deaths
20th-century Australian politicians
United Australia Party members of the Parliament of New South Wales